St Joseph's High School Crossmaglen (Irish: Ardscoil Naomh Iosaif, Cros Mhic Lionnain) is a non selective, Catholic co-educational post primary school located in the town of Crossmaglen in the south of County Armagh.

Catchment area
The school attracts students from the parishes of Upper Creggan, Lower Creggan (except Newtownhamilton) and Forkhill / Mullaghbawn in County Armagh. There are seven feeder primary schools (PS) in County Armagh - St. Patrick's PS, Crossmaglen; St. Patrick's PS, Cullyhanna; Clonalig PS; St. Brigid's PS, Glassdrummond; St. Oliver's PS, Carrickrovaddy,; St. Oliver Plunkett PS, Forkhill; St. Mary's PS, Mullaghbawn - as well as Shelagh NS, Hacksballcross, County Louth.

Facilities
The school has received approval from the Department of Education (Northern Ireland) for a complete rebuild.

Academics
At Key Stage 3 the subjects offered include English and Literacy, Mathematics and Numeracy, Modern Languages (Irish and French), Arts (Art and Design, Music), Environment and Society (Geography, History), Science and Technology (Science, Technology and design), Learning for Life, Physical Education, Religious Education.

In the 2017–18 GCSE examinations, 72% of students at the school achieved five or more GCSEs at grades A* to C, including the core subjects English and Maths.

The school is a partner in the Newry and Mourne Area Learning Community.  Through this partnership, it collaborates with St Paul's High School, Bessbrook in the provision of GCSE and A-Level courses.

References

Catholic secondary schools in Northern Ireland
Schools in County Armagh
Secondary schools in County Armagh